Tukayevo (Tuqay) is a rural locality (a village) in Dushanbekovsky Selsoviet, Kiginsky District, Bashkortostan, Russia. The population was 183 as of 2010. There are 2 streets.

Geography 
Tukayevo is located 13 km northwest of Verkhniye Kigi (the district's administrative centre) by road. Saragulovo is the nearest rural locality.

References 

Rural localities in Kiginsky District